Embryocardia is a condition in which S1 and S2 (the two heart sounds that produce the typical "lubb-dubb" sound of the heart) become indistinguishable and equally spaced. Thus the normal "lubb-dubb" rhythm of the heart becomes a "tic-toc" rhythm resembling the heart sounds of a fetus. This indicates a serious loss of natural fluctuation and often precedes a fatal collapse. This condition is observed in myocarditis.

References

Heart diseases
Symptoms and signs: Cardiac